The teams competing in Group 3 of the 2011 UEFA European Under-21 Championships qualifying competition were Italy, Wales, Hungary, Bosnia and Herzegovina and Luxembourg.

Standings

Matches

Goalscorers
As of 4 September, there have been 41 goals scored over 18 games, for an average of 2.28 goals per game.

1 goal

3
Under
Under
Under
Under
Under
Under